Midai Island is an island in the Natuna Regency, Riau Islands, Indonesia. The island is split between the Midai District and the Suak Midai District. The island is only accessible by boat and has a port on the west side of the island, near Sabang Barat.

References

 
Populated places in Indonesia
Islands of Indonesia